Chinese traditional culture identifies seven types of circumstances in which one should not play the Gu-qin:

When there is a high wind or heavy rain;
When in a mood of great sorrow;
When one's dress is untidy;
When drunk and crazy;
When one has not burned incense;
When one does not understand music or is in rude surroundings;
When one has not bathed or the place is dirty.

See also
 Six Avoidances (Chinese Music)

References
 The Seven Should-not-plays in playing Gu-qin are recorded in "Jing Shi Tong Yan", an ancient Chinese collection of novels written by Feng Meng-long (Feng Menglong) of the Ming Dynasty. The topic is also addressed in a Chinese classical literature masterpiece "Feng Shen Bang" (Gods of Honor).

External links
 Chinese Music and Chinese Musical Instruments

Guqin